Helmi Loussaief (born 12 February 1986) is a footballer who currently plays for PKNS FC as a midfielder in the Malaysia Super League. Born in France, he represented Tunisia at international level.

After graduating from INF Clairefontaine, Helmi joined AS Monaco B in 2004.

References

1986 births
Living people
Association football midfielders
Tunisian footballers
INF Clairefontaine players
Club Africain players
US Monastir (football) players
Spezia Calcio players
PKNS F.C. players
CS Hammam-Lif players
People from Évry, Essonne
French footballers
Footballers from Essonne
French people of Tunisian descent